Ophichthus congroides is an eel in the family Ophichthidae (worm/snake eels). It was described by John E. McCosker in 2010. It is a marine, deep water-dwelling eel which is known from the Tuamotu Islands, in the eastern central Pacific Ocean.

The species epithet "congroides" refers to the species' similarity in condition of the posterior nostril to that of some members of the family Congridae.

References

congroides
Taxa named by John E. McCosker
Fish described in 2010